Lia is a feminine given name. In the Spanish-speaking world, it is accented Lía. In America, the name may be a variant of Leah or Lea. Lia may be a diminutive of various names including Julia, Cecilia, Amelia, Talia, Cornelia, Ophelia, Rosalia / Roselia, Natalia, Aurelia, Adalia / Adelia, Ailia, Apulia, Alia / Aleah. It can also be a surname.

People with the given name Lia
 Lia (artist), Austrian software artist
 Lia (singer), Japanese singer
 Lia, member of the South Korean group Itzy
 Lia Andrea Ramos (born 1981), Philippine model
 Lia Ashmore (born 1995), Paraguayan model and beauty pageant titleholder who was crowned Miss Universe Paraguay 2022
 Lía Bermúdez (1930–2021), Venezuelan sculptor 
 Francesca Lia Block (born 1962), American fantasy writer
 Lia Franca (1912-1988) Italian actress 
 Lía Borrero (born 1976), Panamanian beauty queen 
 Lia Boysen (born 1966), Swedish actress 
 Lia Chang (born 1963), American actress and journalist 
 Lia Corinaldi (1904–1989), Italian teacher and politician 
 Lia Cruz (born 1985), Philippine television host 
 Lia Dorana (1918–2010), a Dutch actress 
 Lia Eibenschütz (1899–1985), German actress 
 Lia Eliava (1934–1998), Georgian actress 
 Lia Félix (1830-1908), French actress
 Lia Finocchiaro (born 1984), Australian politician
 Lia Grimanis (born 1971), Canadian businesswoman
 Lia Halloran (born 1977), American painter
 Lia Ices, stage name of Lia Kessel, American singer-songwriter 
 Lia Marie Johnson (born 1996), American actress and singer
 Lia Knight, a syndicated radio personality in the United States, host of The Lia Show
 Lia Laats (1926-2004), Estonian actress
 Lia Looveer (née Saarepera; 1920–2006), Estonian émigré political activist 
 Lia Maivia (1927–2008), Samoan wrestling promoter 
 Lia Manoliu (1932–1998), Romanian discus thrower
 Lia McHugh (born 2007), American actress
 Lia Menna Barreto (born 1959), Brazilian artist 
 Lia Mills, Irish writer
 Lia Neal (born 1995), American swimmer 
Lia Nici-Townsend (born 1969), British politician
 Lia Pernell (born 1981), American rower
 Lia Purpura (born 1964), American writer 
 Lia Roberts (born Lia Sandu, 1949), Romanian and American politician
 Lia Rousset (born 1977), American canoer 
 Lia Sargent (born 1957), American voice actress 
 Lia Schilhuber, East German canoer 
 Lia Shemtov (born 1958), Israeli politician 
Lia Tadesse (born in 1976), Ethiopian politician 
 Lia van Leer (1924–2015), Israeli film archivist 
 Lia Vissi (born 1955), Cypriot singer-songwriter and politician
 Lia Wälti (born 1993), Swiss football player
 Lia Williams (born 1964), English actress and film director
 Lia Wyler (1934–2018), Brazilian translator

People with the surname Lia
 Brynjar Lia (born 1966), Norwegian historian 
 Donny Lia (born 1978), American race car driver
 Orsa Lia, American female singer
 Simone Lia, English cartoonist and author
 Vince Lia (born 1985), Australian football player

In mythology
 Conán mac Lia, son of Liath Luachra

See also
 Lea (given name)
 Lea (surname)
 Leah (given name)
 Princess Leia, fictional character in Star Wars

Feminine given names
Surnames from given names